Driven is a 2012 novel by James Sallis that is a sequel to the novel Drive (2005).

Plot
Seven years after the events of Drive, Driver is living in Phoenix under the name Paul West, engaged to be married. When two men attack him and his fiancée, leaving her dead, Driver seeks vengeance.

Critical reception
John Wilwol of NPR wrote: "In the end, Driven is simply a great ride, and after you've burned through it like a muscle car burns through a gallon of unleaded, you may feel that particular American ache to hit the open road."

References

External links
 Google Books

2012 American novels
English-language novels
Sequel novels
American crime novels
Novels set in Phoenix, Arizona
Poisoned Pen Press books
Third-person narrative novels